Marghita (Margaretin) is a city in Bihor County, Romania. It administers two villages, Cheț (Magyarkéc) and Ghenetea (Genyéte).

Geography
It lies on the banks of the river Barcău,  extending to the border with Satu Mare County; the river Inot discharges into the Barcău in Marghita.

The city borders the following communes: Viișoara and Abram to the east, Tăuteu to the south, Petreu and Buduslău to the west, and Sălacea and Pir to the north.

History
The name appears to be derived from the name "Margit" (Margaret), Saint Margaret the patron of a local church. The first time it was used in a document was in 1216. In the 14th century, it became a feudal holding of the Hungarian landlord.

In 1376 King Louis I of Hungary gave Marghita the right of organizing a fair and it developed in the next centuries as a market town. There were several peasant revolts against the feudal system affecting Marghita in 1467 and 1514. At the beginning of the 16th century, it became along with parts of Bihor County and Hungary an Ottoman province until towards the end of the 17th century.

In 1823, a great fire destroyed half of the buildings of Marghita. After the 1848 revolution, the local peasants were no longer serfs and manufacturing and industry began to develop.

In the aftermath of World War I and the ensuing Hungarian–Romanian War, the Romanian Army entered the town, and after Treaty of Trianon of 1920, Marghita became part of the Kingdom of Romania. In the wake of the Second Vienna Award of August 30, 1940, the territory of Northern Transylvania (of which the town of Marghita was part) reverted to the Kingdom of Hungary. In 1944, after German occupation, about 2,100 Jews of Marghita were sent to death, concentration, and labor camps as part of the Holocaust, of which only about 450 survived. Towards the end of World War II, the town was taken back from Hungarian and German troops by Romanian and Soviet forces in October 1944, during the initial stages of the Battle of Debrecen.

After 1947, with the Soviets imposing a Communist government in Romania, factories and land were nationalized. Over the course of the next few years, Marghita took part in the Romanian industrialization process. Following the administrative reform of 1950, the town became the seat of Marghita Raion within Bihor Region (renamed Oradea Region in 1952 and Crișana Region in 1960). In 1967, Marghita was declared a city. In 1968, the old territorial division into județe was reinstituted, and Marghita reverted to being part of Bihor County. In 2003, it was declared a municipiu.

Politics
The Marghita Municipal Council, elected in the 2012 local government elections, is made up of 17 councillors, with the following party composition:

Population

At the 2011 census, Marghita had a population of 15,134. According to the census, 51.7% of inhabitants are Romanians, 44.1% Hungarians, 3.5% Roma and 0.5% Slovaks.

Natives
Attila Cseke (born 1973), Romanian lawyer and politician
Nicolas Farkas (1890–1982), Austro-Hungarian-born cinematographer, screenwriter, and film director
Violeta Friedman (1930–2000), Jewish Holocaust survivor turned author
Brigitta Gődér (born 1992), Hungarian-Romanian footballer
György Harag (1925–1985), theatre director and actor, worked primarily in Hungarian-language theatres in Romania
George Pușcaș (born 1996), Romanian professional footballer
Iosif Szökő (1930–2008), Hungarian-Romanian footballer
Ioan Vulpescu (born 1976), Romanian politician

Transportation

The city is traversed by national road , which connects the town of Săcueni,  to the west, with  Nușfalău, Sălaj County,  to the south-east. County road DJ191 connects it to Tășnad to the north.

The Marghita train station serves the Via Terra rail line connecting Oradea to Sărmășag, Sălaj County.

Education

Marghita is home to three high schools: the Octavian Goga National College,
the Horváth János Theoretical High School, and the Horea Technological High School. There are also several elementary schools and three kindergartens.

Sister cities
 Kiskőrös, Hungary

References

Cities in Romania
Populated places in Bihor County
Localities in Crișana
Place names of Hungarian origin in Romania